"Affirmation" is a song by Savage Garden, released as the third single from their second studio album of the same name (1999). It peaked at number 16 in Australia and number eight on the UK Singles Chart.

Background
The lyrics are a series of statements each starting with "I believe", for instance: "I believe in Karma, what you give is what you get returned" and "I believe you can't appreciate real love until you've been burned". The song was performed live at the Sydney Olympic Games Closing Ceremony in October 2000, with Darren wearing a T-shirt depicting the Aboriginal flag.

The European music video is a collection of clips from the group's tour of Brisbane, entitled Superstars and Cannonballs. The original Australian version of the music video comprises various pictures and footage from history throughout the 20th century. The single was most successful in the United Kingdom where it reached number eight, becoming the duo's fourth Top 10 hit.

Track listings
All live tracks were recorded at the Brisbane Entertainment Centre in May 2000.

 Australian CD single
 "Affirmation"
 "I Don't Care"
 "Affirmation" (Stop Beats mix)
 "I Knew I Loved You" (crossover mix)

 UK CD1
 "Affirmation" (radio version) – 4:15
 "Affirmation" (Almighty remix)
 "Crash & Burn" (Eddie's crossover mix) – 3:40

 UK CD2
 "Affirmation" (live) – 5:46
 "Truly Madly Deeply" (live) – 4:37
 "I Knew I Loved You" (live) – 4:56

 UK cassette single
 "Affirmation" – 4:54
 "Truly Madly Deeply" (live) – 4:37

 European CD single
 "Affirmation" (radio version) – 4:15
 "Affirmation" (Stop Beats mix) – 4:15

 European maxi-CD single
 "Affirmation" (radio version) – 4:15
 "Affirmation" (Stop Beats mix) – 4:15
 "I Knew I Loved You" (Eddie's savage dance mix) – 5:58
 "Two Beds and a Coffee Machine" (piano and vocal mix) – 3:25

 Japanese CD single
 "Affirmation" (groovy mix)
 "I Knew I Loved You" (Mini-Me mix)
 "I Knew I Loved You" (Eddie's rhythm radio mix)
 "Two Beds and a Coffee Machine" (piano and vocal)
 "I Don't Care" (original version)

Charts

Weekly charts

Year-end charts

Certifications

Release history

Notes

References

1999 songs
2000 singles
Columbia Records singles
Savage Garden songs
Song recordings produced by Walter Afanasieff
Songs written by Daniel Jones (musician)
Songs written by Darren Hayes
Sony Music Entertainment Japan singles
Warner Music Australasia singles